Giorgi Chochishvili (born 7 May 1998) is a Georgian football player. He plays for Merani Tbilisi.

Club career
He made his fully professional debut in the Fortuna Liga for ViOn Zlaté Moravce on 5 May 2018 in a game against Senica, as a starter.

International
He was the starting goalkeeper for the Georgia U19 team that participated in the 2017 UEFA European Under-19 Championship as hosts. Georgia did not advance from the group stage.

References

External links
 
 

1998 births
Footballers from Tbilisi
Living people
Footballers from Georgia (country)
Georgia (country) youth international footballers
Georgia (country) under-21 international footballers
Association football goalkeepers
FC Saburtalo Tbilisi players
SK Slavia Prague players
FC ViOn Zlaté Moravce players
FC Sioni Bolnisi players
FC Dila Gori players
FC Telavi players
FC Merani Tbilisi players
Czech First League players
Slovak Super Liga players
Erovnuli Liga players
Expatriate footballers from Georgia (country)
Expatriate footballers in the Czech Republic
Expatriate footballers in Slovakia
Expatriate sportspeople from Georgia (country) in Slovakia
Expatriate sportspeople from Georgia (country) in the Czech Republic